This is a non-exhaustive list of Lebanon women's international footballers – association football players who have appeared at least once for the senior Lebanon women's national football team.

Players

Born outside Lebanon 
The following players:
have played at least one game for the full (senior women's) Lebanon international team; and
were born outside Lebanon.

This list includes players who have dual citizenship with Lebanon and/or have become naturalized Lebanese citizens.

See also 
 List of Lebanon international footballers
 List of Lebanon international footballers born outside Lebanon
 Lebanon women's national football team results

References 

 
women's
Lebanon women
Association football player non-biographical articles
Lebanon
Lebanon
Lebanese diaspora
Lebanon